Kevin Robert Parks (born 9 July 1935) is a former Australian rules footballer who played with Essendon in the Victorian Football League (VFL).

Parks started out at Kilmore but was playing with Broadford when recruited by Essendon. A half back, he played eight games for Essendon in the 1958 VFL season and appeared twice the following year.

He played for Kyneton from 1960 to 1966 and captain-coached a premiership team in the last of those years. In 1960 he won the  Bendigo league's best and fairest award.

References

1935 births
Australian rules footballers from Victoria (Australia)
Essendon Football Club players
Kyneton Football Club players
Living people